Safan language may refer to:
a dialect of Casuarina Coast Asmat in New Guinea
Safen language in Senegal